The Waterdance is a 1992 American drama film directed by Neal Jimenez and Michael Steinberg and starring Eric Stoltz, Wesley Snipes, William Forsythe, and Helen Hunt. It was written by Neal Jimenez. The film is a semi-autobiographical story about a young fiction writer who becomes tetraplegic fully paralyzed in a hiking accident and works to rehabilitate his body and mind at a rehabilitation center. 

The title refers to a dream recounted by Raymond Hill, Snipes's character, about dancing on the surface of a lake. Since, in Raymond's dream, he must continue dancing on the lake to avoid sinking and drowning, the dream may be a metaphoric reference to the necessity of continually coping with the world.

Plot 
Joel Garcia is a writer who, after a hiking accident at a mountain, must struggle with paralysis. At the same time, he carries a relationship with Anna, a married woman, with whom he was having an affair at the time of the accident. The lovers attempt to carry on their affair during his emotional and difficult rehabilitation as a paraplegic.

Cast

Reception

Critical response
The Waterdance received mostly positive reviews from critics; it holds a 94% approval rating at Rotten Tomatoes from 17 reviews.

In a review that awarded  three and a half stars out of four, Roger Ebert praised Stoltz's acting and commented, "'The Waterdance' is about the everyday process of continuing one's life under a tragically altered set of circumstances. It considers what life is, and under what conditions it is worth living. After all the cheap sentiment that's been brought to this subject over the years, it is exhilarating and challenging to see a movie that knows exactly what it's talking about, and looks you straight in the eye."

Steve Davis of The Austin Chronicle wrote, "The performances are nothing less than extraordinary. Stoltz, an actor who has seldom exhibited anything but genial blandness, uses this temperament to good effect here as Joel, a man who tempers the bitterness he feels over what's happened to him with benign acceptance. Snipes and Forsythe are both superb as the two fellow travelers in wheelchairs whom Joel befriends in the ward; their emoting is so real you often forget they're actors."

Accolades
The Waterdance won the Audience Award for Best Dramatic Feature and the Waldo Salt Screenwriting Award at the 1992 Sundance Film Festival.

The Waterdance was nominated for four Independent Spirit Awards in 1992 and was the only film to win two awards that year for Best First Feature and Best Screenplay.

References

External links 
 
 

Sundance Film Festival award winners
1992 films
1992 directorial debut films
1992 drama films
1992 independent films
American independent films
American drama films
Films about paraplegics or quadriplegics
Films about writers
Films directed by Michael Steinberg
Films produced by Gale Anne Hurd
Films scored by Michael Convertino
The Samuel Goldwyn Company films
1990s English-language films
1990s American films
Films about disability